An aircraft approach category is a grouping which differentiates aircraft based on the speed at which the aircraft approaches a runway for landing.

They are used to determine airspace, obstacle clearance and visibility requirements for instrument approaches.

Definition

The International Civil Aviation Organization (ICAO) classifies aircraft by their indicated airspeed at runway threshold (Vat, also known as approach speed or VREF).

The categories are as follows:

Category A: less than 169 km/h (91 kt) indicated airspeed (IAS)
Category B: 169 km/h (91 kt) or more but less than 224 km/h (121 kt) IAS
Category C: 224 km/h (121 kt) or more but less than 261 km/h (141 kt) IAS
Category D: 261 km/h (141 kt) or more but less than 307 km/h (166 kt) IAS
Category E: 307 km/h (166 kt) or more but less than 391 km/h (211 kt) IAS
Category H: Helicopters

Helicopters may use Category A minima on instrument procedures designed for aeroplanes, or may use specific procedures designed for helicopters.

Threshold speed is calculated as 1.3 times stall speed Vs0 or 1.23 times stall speed Vs1g in the landing configuration at maximum certificated landing mass. Aircraft approach categories do not change during day-to-day operation. To change an aircraft's category, an aircraft must be re-certified with a different maximum landing mass.

The maximum permitted speed for visual manoeuvring is significantly higher than the threshold speed. Additional speed ranges are specified for other segments of the approach.

Approach plates generally include visibility requirements up to category D. While ICAO specify a top speed of 391 km/h for Category E, there exist no aircraft with an approach speed above this.

United States of America 
Approach category definitions in the United States of America are similar to those defined by ICAO. They are defined in terms of VREF of a given aircraft, or if VREF is not specified, 1.3 Vs0 at the maximum certificated landing weight. The values of VREF, VS0, and the maximum certificated landing weight are established for the aircraft by the certification authority of the country of registry. The United States does not give a top speed for Category E.

Examples 

Selected examples from FAA Circular 150/5300-13A - Airport Design:

The Northrop T-38 Talon is an example of an Approach Category E aircraft.

See also
Aircraft category
Wake turbulence category

References 

Aircraft operations